Parkerville can refer to:

Parkerville, Kansas, United States
Parkerville, Western Australia, a suburb of Perth